Battle is a 2018 drama film directed by Katarina Launing and written by Karsten Fullu and Maja Lunde.

Plot 
Dancer Amalie (Lisa Teige) is preparing for an upcoming dance competition, and all seems to be going well. Soon Amalie’s life takes a turn for the worse, though, putting her entire dance career at risk.

Cast 
 Lisa Teige as Amalie
 Fabian Svegaard Tapia as Mikael
 Vebjørn Enger as Aksel
 Stig R. Amdam as Bjørn
 Silje Marie Baltzersen as Ida
 Charlott Utzig as Charlotte
 Sofie Albertine Foss as Vanessa
 Georgia May Anta as Alex
 Sigyn Åsa Sætereng as Kim
 Morad Aziman as Josef
 Lucas Lute as The Loot
 Karen-Lise Mynster as Birgitta
 Bao Andre Nguyen as Moa
 Marius Vold as Elliot
 Rebekka Reienes Andresen as Camilla

References

External links 
 
 
 

2018 films
2018 drama films
2010s Norwegian-language films
2010s English-language films
Norwegian drama films
2018 multilingual films
Norwegian multilingual films